Bulbophyllum melinanthum is a species of orchid in the genus Bulbophyllum. Also known as the millet-like bulbophyllum, it can be found in the forests of New Guinea.

References

The Bulbophyllum-Checklist
The Internet Orchid Species Photo Encyclopedia

melinanthum